Buffington is an unincorporated community in Stoddard County, in the U.S. state of Missouri.

History
A post office called Buffington was established in 1877, and remained in operation until 1905. The community has the name of one Mr. Buffington, the proprietor of a local sawmill.

References

Unincorporated communities in Stoddard County, Missouri
Unincorporated communities in Missouri
1877 establishments in Missouri